Running Wild is the fifth studio album by the British heavy metal band Girlschool, released on Mercury Records in 1985.

It is the only studio work released as a five-piece group by Girlschool, after original lead guitarist Kelly Johnson had left the band. Vocals duties on the album are shared by Jackie Bodimead and Kim McAuliffe.

Running Wild was released only in America. It was produced by Nick Tauber, previously known for his work with Thin Lizzy, Marillion, and Toyah.

"Do You Love Me?" is a cover of the song from Kiss' album Destroyer (1976).

Track listing

Personnel
Band members
Jackie Bodimead – lead and backing vocals, keyboards
Kim McAulliffe – rhythm guitar, lead vocals on tracks 3, 8, backing vocals, 
Cris Bonacci – lead guitar
Gil Weston-Jones – bass
Denise Dufort – drums

Production
Nick Tauber - producer
Paul O'Duffy - engineer, mixing
Neil Kernon - remixing of tracks 1, 2, 6

References

External links
Official Girlschool discography

1985 albums
Girlschool albums
Mercury Records albums